FC Karlivka  was an amateur Ukrainian football club that was based in Karlivka, Poltavska Oblast.

History
The club was formed in 2011 as FC Karlivka and competed in amateur competitions including the Poltava oblast.

The club forged a tie with FC Poltava after the senior club was promoted to the Ukrainian First League in 2012 the main club entered the team as a Reserve team into the Ukrainian Second League competition for the 2012–13 season.

Mashynobudivnyk Stadium was reconstructed in 2012 with a capacity for 1,300 spectators.

Prior to the start of the 2013–14 Ukrainian Second League season the club severed its ties with FC Poltava as their Reserve team and reregistered with the PFL as FC Karlivka.

Name
2011– Jun. 2012 – FC Karlivka
Jul. 2012– Jun. 2013 – FC Poltava-2 Karlivka
Jun. 2013–  FC Karlivka

League and cup history

References

External links
  Fan club 

 
Karlivka, FC
Karlivkaf
FC Poltava
Association football clubs established in 2011
2011 establishments in Ukraine